The Berkshire International Film Festival (BIFF) was founded in 2005 by Kelley Vickery in
Great Barrington, Massachusetts. The four-day festival features independent films for filmmakers and film aficionados, with showings of features, documentaries, shorts, and animation—as well as panel discussions and special events focusing on filmmakers and talented artists from both sides of the camera.

It is scheduled in mid-May as a kick-off to the Berkshires cultural season.  BIFF aims to provide filmmakers, producers, directors, writers and actors a place to present their work and to interact with each other and with the audience. The Festival aims to showcase challenging and relevant documentaries, and to provide a platform for Berkshire filmmakers. In 2010 the festival attracted 500 submissions, of which 77 were selected for screening.

Selected films
2016
 Untouchable, directed by David Feige
2012
 2 Days in New York, directed by Julie Delpy
  Café de Flore, directed by Jean-Marc Vallée
2011
  Pina, directed by Wim Wenders
2010
  Cairo Time directed by Ruba Nadda
  Joan Rivers: A Piece of Work directed by Ricki Stern and Anne Sundberg
  Atletu (The Athlete) directed by Davey Frankel and Rasselas Lakew
 Countdown to Zero directed by Lucy Walker
  My Year Without Sex directed by Sarah Watt
  Waste Land directed by Lucy Walker
  Last Train Home directed by Lixin Fan
2009
  William Kunstler: Disturbing the Universe, directed by Emily Kunstler and Sarah Kunstler
  The Yes Men Fix the World, directed by Andy Bichlbaum and Mike Bonanno
  Spike, directed by Robert Beaucage
  Burning Plain directed by Guillermo Arriaga
  Pressure Cooker directed by  Mark Becker and Jennifer Grausman
2008
 A Prairie Home Companion directed by Robert Altman
  The Road to Guantanamo directed by Michael Winterbottom
  Man Push Cart directed by Ramin Bahrani
  Rocket Science directed by Jeffrey Blitz
  In the Shadow of the Moon directed by David Sington and Christopher Riley
2007
 Arranged directed by Diane Crespo and Stefan Schaefer

References

Further reading

External links
 Berkshire Film and Media Commission
 BerkshireFineArts.com
 

Film festivals in Massachusetts
Film festivals established in 2005
Berkshires